John Kipling Turner (20 May 1913 – 1979) was an English professional footballer who played in the Football League for Leeds United and Mansfield Town.

References

1913 births
1979 deaths
English footballers
Association football forwards
English Football League players
Worksop Town F.C. players
Leeds United F.C. players
Mansfield Town F.C. players
Bristol City F.C. players